Batulia is a village in Svoge Municipality, Sofia Province, western Bulgaria.

In 1944, the British intelligence officer Frank Thompson died in Batulia fighting the Bulgarian gendarmerie.

References

Villages in Sofia Province